Walter Strenge (May 2, 1898 – September 2, 1974) was an American cinematographer.

Selected filmography
 The Talk of Hollywood (1929)
 Mother's Boy (1929)
 The Exile (1931)
 Messenger of Peace (1947)
 Appointment with Murder (1948)
 Reaching from Heaven (1948) 
 The Sickle or the Cross (1949)
 The Pilgrimage Play (1949)
 Million Dollar Pursuit (1951)
 Secrets of Monte Carlo (1951)
 Venture of Faith (1951)
 Stagecoach to Fury (1956)
 The Power of the Resurrection (1958)
Had a screen credit on "The Munsters."

References

Bibliography
  Len D. Martin. The Republic Pictures Checklist: Features, Serials, Cartoons, Short Subjects and Training Films of Republic Pictures Corporation, 1935-1959. McFarland, 1998.

External links

1898 births
1974 deaths
American cinematographers
Artists from Albany, New York